Otavice is a village southeast of the town of Ribnica in southern Slovenia. The area is part of the traditional region of Lower Carniola and is now included in the Southeast Slovenia Statistical Region. It includes the hamlet of Ograda southeast of the main settlement.

Geography
Otavice is a ribbon village below the Little Mountain chain in the eastern part of the Ribnica Valley. The nearby forests are rich in linden and fir, which has led to their use for bee forage. The Sela meadows lie west of the settlement, the Rupče hay fields to the east, and the sparse Stevniki oak woods to the north. The soil is stony and sandy, making potatoes a principal crop, but crop damage by deer has led to many fields being planted in clover. Coniferous and mixed woods rise above the village on Little Mountain. Bršljunovka Cave on Little Mountain is fed by a spring.

Name
Otavice was mentioned in written sources in 1340 as Ottawnich (and as Ottawnikch and Ottownikch in 1436). The name Otavice is probably derived from the Slovene common noun otava 'second crop (of hay)', referring to a meadow where hay could be harvested twice during the summer. In the past, the settlement was known as Otawitz in German.

History
The remnants of a Roman road pass near the village, attesting to early settlement in the area. Oral tradition relates that there are Ottoman graves in Tur Field at the foot of Little Mountain. A water main was installed in the village in 1960, supplying water from Obrh Spring near Blate via Goriča Vas. Traditional handicrafts in the village included making rakes with wood from Kočevje Rog. Peddling declined in the 20th century as people started commuting to Ribnica to work.

Mass grave

Otavice is the site of a mass grave associated with the Second World War. It contains the remains of unidentified victims.

Cultural heritage
There is a small chapel-shrine in the settlement. It was built in the late 19th or early 20th century. The shrine contains a statue of Our Lady of Sorrows that oral tradition says was brought from Rome.

References

External links
Otavice on Geopedia

Populated places in the Municipality of Ribnica